Villem Gross (pseudonym Ott Varangu; born on 11 January 1922 Tartu – died on 6 April 2001) was an Estonian writer.

During World War II he served in the 8th Estonian Rifle Corps. After the war he held a journalist job. From 1950 he was a member of Estonian Writers' Union.

Selected works
 1955: play Ankeet ('Questionnaire')
 1975: novel Talvepuhkus ('Winter Holiday')
 1978: novel Vaikimise motiivid ('Motifs of Silence')

References

1922 births
2001 deaths
20th-century Estonian novelists
Writers from Tartu
Recipients of the Order of the Red Banner of Labour
Estonian dramatists and playwrights
Estonian journalists
Estonian male novelists
Estonian male poets
Estonian people of World War II
Soviet military personnel of World War II
Soviet writers